Linda Muir is a Canadian costume designer. Her studio is in Toronto, Ontario.

Muir designed the costumes for Atom Egoyan's 1994 film Exotica, and won the Genie Award for Best Costume Design. She was also nominated for When Night Is Falling (1995). With Lilies (1996), for which she made a ballroom gown for male actor Remy Girard, Muir said her job was "not to dress men in women's clothing but to build [female] costumes for men's bodies". She won another Genie Award for Lilies.

In December 2013, she joined the crew for the film The Witch, and consulted 35 books in the Clothes of the Common People in Elizabethan and Early Stuart England series to plan the costumes. The costumes were made with wool, linen, or hemp. Muir also lobbied for a larger costume budget.

References

Best Costume Design Genie and Canadian Screen Award winners
Canadian costume designers
Living people
People from Toronto
Year of birth missing (living people)
Canadian women in film
Women costume designers